1461 Trabzon FK, formerly Hekimoğlu Trabzon FK, is a Turkish sports club located in Trabzon, Turkey. The football team currently plays in the TFF Second League.

The club was previously known as Birlik Nakliyat Düzyurtspor and Baysal İnşaat Düzyurtspor.

Stadium
Currently the team plays at the Yavuz Selim Stadium, which has a capacity of 1,820.

League participations
TFF Second League: 2014–15, 2019–
TFF Third League: 2013–14, 2015–19
Turkish Regional Amateur League: 2011–13
Turkish Amateur Football Leagues: 1986–2011

References

External links
Official website
1461 Trabzon FK on TFF.org

Football clubs in Turkey
Association football clubs established in 1986
Sport in Trabzon
1986 establishments in Turkey